Carlo J. Caparas' Panday or simply Panday is a Philippine fantasy television series on ABS-CBN. The pilot episode of the first book (Panday: Unang Yugto) aired on November 7, 2005, replacing Ikaw ang Lahat sa Akin and ended with its last episode on December 9, 2005. The second book (Panday: Ang Ikalawang Yugto) aired its pilot episode on April 3, 2006, ended with the series finale on May 26, 2006, and was replaced by Calla Lily. The series is based on the fictional comics character of the same name, which was created by Carlo J. Caparas and illustrated by Steve Gan.

Background
Panday literally means "the blacksmith". Ang Panday is the TV adaptation of the Fernando Poe Jr. film series Ang Panday from the early 1980s. It is about a blacksmith who made an enchanted sword that gives him special powers to battle the dark forces.

Some of the location shots were taken in a remote town in Bohol, where the beach is white. Locals called it "colgate-white".

Plot
A meteor crashes into the desert of Sto. Sepulcro. The town blacksmith, Flavio, forges a dagger and a churchbell from the remains of the meteor. He uses the dagger to fight off the evil Sombra Oscura, who constantly attacks the town. By some mystical power, the dagger transforms into a great sword every time Flavio wields it.

In his final battle against evil, the Panday faces off against Lizardo, the son of Rodgin and the leader of the Sombras. The battle is intense, but Flavio prevails in the end, vanquishing Lizardo.

Having saved Sto. Sepulcro, Flavio decides to give up his sword. He goes to the church and casts his fabled weapon into the bell he also made. A white light then shoots out from the sky, and it lifts up Panday into the heavens.

The people of Sto. Sepulcro rejoice now that Panday has brought them peace. Unbeknownst to them, the Sombras discover that there is a part of Lizardo that is still alive — his brain.

To bring him back to life, they must transcend time and space to look for the girl who can resurrect their master.
In that time, Tristan, (played by Jericho Rosales) as the town's blacksmith, forges another sword with the same Flavio created.

Cast and characters

Main cast
Jericho Rosales as Tristan/Panday
Heart Evangelista as Eden/Camia

Supporting cast
Victor Neri as Lizardo
Nante Montreal as Tata Selo
Julio Pacheco as Utoy

Unang Yugto characters

World 1
Phillip Salvador as Flavio/Panday
Marianne dela Riva as Esmeralda
Nante Montreal as Tata Selo
Roldan Aquino as Mang Emong
Chris Vertido as Padre Damian
Shyr Valdez as Lolita
Chen Zenhric Dimayuga as Diego
Ian de Leon as Domingo
Christopher Roxas as Julio
Neri Naig as Florentina
Eva Darren as Nana Selo
Bea Nicolas as Henia
Joe Gruta as Misteryosong Matanda
Joshua Dionisio as Boyet
Mico Palanca as Alfred
Mike Austria as Mr. Roxas
Vivian Foz as Mrs. Roxas
Michaela Espinosa as Danica

Ikalawang Yugto characters

World 2
Derek Ramsay as Kahimu
Monsour del Rosario as Kaupay
Levi Ignacio as Kahuyo
Dan Fernandez as Kabuog
Apreal Tolentino as Suruguon
Jeni Hernandez as Madalagan
Ashley Silverio as Mabaysay
Vanessa Gomez as Masayawon
Maricar Fernandez as Makantahon
Diana Dayao as Matawahon

World 3
Kristine Hermosa as Camia
Paw Diaz as Dahlia
Anna Larrucea as Magnolia
Tanya Gomez as Violeta (past)
Erich Gonzales as Violeta (present)
Rafael Rosell as Calyptus
Eric Fructuoso as Gumma
Ketchup Eusebio as Orkido

Villains

Unang Yugto villains

World 1
Rommel Montano as Socur
Mon Confiado as Magnus
Levi Ignacio as Feirrus
Paul Guzman as Rusticus 
Aleck Bovick as Lady Feirrus

Ikalawang Yugto villains

World 2
Dimples Romana as Manaram
Michelle Bayle as Andam

World 3
Victor Neri as Jiamondo
Carlos Agassi as Jaffir
Jeremiah Rosales as Emer
Bernard Palanca as Kamatayan

Production

Casting
In June 2005, Heart Evangelista was cast as Eden, the love interest of Tristan, after a two-month-long auditioning process was conducted by ABS-CBN.

Reception
According to AGB Neilsen, the pilot episode of Ang Panday gained an impressive of 44.7% national ratings, winning against its rival Encantadia.

See also
Fantaserye and telefantasya
List of shows previously aired by ABS-CBN
List of dramas of ABS-CBN
Ang Panday (2016 TV series)
Ang Panday (2017 film)

References

External links

Panday
2005 Philippine television series debuts
2006 Philippine television series endings
ABS-CBN drama series
Fantaserye and telefantasya
Filipino-language television shows
Television series by Star Creatives
Television shows based on comics
Television shows set in the Philippines